Lauvray is a surname. Notable people with the surname include:

Abel Lauvray (1870–1950), French painter
Léon Lauvray (1877–1965), French politician